Under cover removal, or UCR, is a method for colour printers to use less ink. Black ink is used for grey colours instead of the three CMY inks.

External links
Under cover removal

Computer printers